Rhys Jones is a Welsh rugby union player. A fly half, he is the son of former Wales international Kingsley Jones. Rhys Jones has played in Wales Youth, Under 18, Under 19, Under 20 and Wales 7s international.

Jones played for Sale Sharks, Cardiff Blues and the Cornish Pirates before heading back to Wales to Newport RFC and Wales 7s.
Whilst playing for the Cornish Pirates, Jones was selected for the Wales national rugby sevens team squad.

In May 2010 Jones joined Newport RFC. Jones was selected for the Wales Sevens team for the 2010 Commonwealth Games rugby sevens tournament.

In July 2011 Rhys Jones joined the Scarlets.

He was selected in the Wales Sevens squad for 2012–13.

References

External links
Newport RFC profile
Scarlets profile

Welsh rugby union players
Rugby sevens players at the 2010 Commonwealth Games
Rugby union fly-halves
Sale Sharks players
Cardiff Rugby players
Newport RFC players
Scarlets players
Barbarian F.C. players
Rugby union players from Abergavenny
Living people
1987 births
Commonwealth Games rugby sevens players of Wales